In functional analysis, a branch of mathematics, the Ryll-Nardzewski fixed-point theorem states that if  is a normed vector space and  is a nonempty convex subset of  that is compact under the weak topology, then every group (or equivalently: every semigroup) of affine isometries of  has at least one fixed point. (Here, a fixed point of a set of maps is a point that is fixed by each map in the set.)

This theorem was announced by Czesław Ryll-Nardzewski. Later Namioka and Asplund  gave a proof based on a different approach. Ryll-Nardzewski himself gave a complete proof in the original spirit.

Applications
The Ryll-Nardzewski theorem yields the existence of a Haar measure on compact groups.

See also
 Fixed-point theorems
 Fixed-point theorems in infinite-dimensional spaces
 Markov-Kakutani fixed-point theorem - abelian semigroup of continuous affine self-maps on compact convex set in a topological vector space has a fixed point

References

 Andrzej Granas and James Dugundji, Fixed Point Theory (2003) Springer-Verlag, New York, .
 A proof written by J. Lurie

Fixed-point theorems
Theorems in functional analysis